James Sharpe (1877–1943), also known as Olly Oakley, was a British banjo player and composer. He was considered a prominent zither-banjo player in England. His music made up a part of early banjo recordings on the phonograph, and during his life, he became "the most widely recorded English banjoist". Other than his performing name of Olly Oakley, he alternately recorded under the pseudonyms Fred Turner, Signor Cetra, Jack Sherwood, Mr F Curtis, Frank Forrester, and Tim Holes.

Life and career
James Sharpe was born in Birmingham, England in 1877. He started to play the banjo around age 12 after hearing the Bohee Brothers' music. Sharpe's music was influenced by minstrel songs, with a style of playing that was similar to the Bohee Brothers'. He played ragtime music, sentimental songs and original pieces.

From the late 1890s to the 1930s, Sharpe made hundreds of recordings on various labels and performed at British music halls. During the 1910s, his compositions for banjo were played at various concert programs in England. In 1915, he toured South Africa, performing on the banjo.

He made recordings including with Pathé and was filmed on Phonofilm.

Sharpe died in 1943.

Discography
"Rubgy Parade March" G & T (1901)
"Oakley Quickstep", Edison
"Poppies and Wheat"
"Whistling Rufus"
"The College Rag"
"Queen of the Burlesque" (1912) - phonograph, music by A. Tilley

See also
Coon song
Minstrel show

References

British banjoists
20th-century British musicians
1877 births
1943 deaths